The table below details the Grand Prix results of the other teams for which Mercedes was an engine supplier.

Complete Formula One results

1990s
(key)

2000s
(key)

2010s
(key)

2020s
(key)

Notes
* – Season still in progress.
† – The driver did not finish the Grand Prix, but was classified, as he completed over 90% of the race distance.
‡ – Half points awarded as less than 75% of the race distance was completed.

Notes

References

Formula One constructor results
Mercedes-Benz in Formula One